Dase may refer to:
 Zacharias Dase (1824–1861), German mental calculator
 Dase (Erpe), a river of Hesse, Germany, tributary of the Erpe